Idlers is a Canadian reggae band from St. John's, Newfoundland and Labrador, consisting of eleven members.

History
Idlers was founded in 2006 by Paul Schiralli-Earle, Tommy Duggan, and Mark Wilson, and released an EP that year. By the time that the  band's first full album, Corner, was released in 2008, there were ten members. The band toured in Canada as far as the prairie provinces.

In March 2009, Idlers traveled to Dreamland Studio in West Hurley, New York, to record their second album, Keep Out. Darryl Jenifer, Bad Brains bassist and Bedouin Soundclash producer, produced the album.  The engineer was Phil Burnett. That year they also performed at the Newfoundland and Labrador Folk Festival, and later and toured in western Canada, including British Columbia. Keep Out won an East Coast Music Award for best world music album.

In 2011 the band opened for NOFX's concert in St. John's.

The band has been inactive since 2014.

Members
 Mark Wilson - vocals, trumpet
Erin Best - vocals
Aneirin Thomas - bass
Craig Millett- vocals, guitar
Chris Power - drums
Luke Power - keys
Chris Harnett - saxophone
Susan Evoy - saxophone
John Duff - trombone
Curtis Andrews - percussion
B.A. Wheeler - drums
Tommy Duggan - bass
Paul Schiralli-Earle - guitar, vocals, song writing

Discography
 Idlers EP (2006)
 Corner (2007)
 Keep Out (2009)
 Idlers (2013)

References

External links
Idlers official website
Idlers on Myspace
Idlers on CBC Radio 3

Musical groups established in 2006
Musical groups from St. John's, Newfoundland and Labrador
Canadian ska groups